Cry Cry Cry is the fourth studio album by the Canadian indie rock band Wolf Parade, released on October 6, 2017.

Track listing

Personnel 
 Spencer Krug – vocals, keyboards
 Dan Boeckner – vocals, guitar
 Arlen Thompson - drums
 Dante DeCaro – guitar, bass, percussion, keyboards
 Chris Thompson - horns (tracks 4, 6 and 9)
 Patrick Simpson - horns (tracks 4, 6 and 9)
 Phil Hamelin - horns (tracks 4, 6 and 9)
 John Goodmanson - producer, engineering, mixing
 Eric Corson - engineering
 Greg Calbi - mastering
 Steve Fallone - additional mastering
 Jordan Koop - assistant mixing
 Inka Bell - artwork, design
 Ray Janos - lacquer cut

Charts

References

2017 albums
Wolf Parade albums
Sub Pop albums
Albums produced by John Goodmanson
Albums recorded at Robert Lang Studios